La Torre de los suplicios ("The Tower of Torture") is a 1941 Mexican film. It stars Luis Alcoriza.

External links
 

1941 films
1940s Spanish-language films
Mexican black-and-white films
Mexican romantic drama films
1941 romantic drama films
1940s Mexican films